Less than Zero may refer to:

Written works 
 Less than Zero (novel), a 1985 novel by Bret Easton Ellis

Television and film 
 Less than Zero (film), a 1987 film directed by Marek Kanievska based on the novel
 Less than Zero, a 2018 television series adaption of the novel produced by Hulu

Songs and albums 
 "Less than Zero" (Elvis Costello song), a 1977 song by Elvis Costello
 "Less than Zero" (The Weeknd song), a 2022 song by the Weeknd
 Less than Zero (soundtrack), the soundtrack to the 1987 film
 Less than Zero, a 2005 album by LA Symphony

Other meanings 
 Any negative number

See also 
 Below Zero (disambiguation)